Chloé Chevalier (born 2 November 1995) is a French biathlete. She has competed in the Biathlon World Cup since 2017. She is the younger sister of fellow biathlete Anaïs Chevalier.

Biathlon results

Olympic Games

World Championships

World Cup
World Cup rankings

Relay victories
3 victories

References

External links

1995 births
Living people
French female biathletes
Biathletes at the 2012 Winter Youth Olympics
People from Saint-Martin-d'Hères
Sportspeople from Isère
21st-century French women